Damon Jones (born September 18, 1974 in Evanston, Illinois) is a former professional American football player who played tight end for five seasons for the Jacksonville Jaguars. Jones was the first tight end selected in draft by the Jaguars. Jones attended Evanston Township High School, where he was a star tight end & defensive end and basketball star. Jones is currently the lineman football coach at Jean Ribault Senior High School.

References
 

1974 births
Living people
American football tight ends
Jacksonville Jaguars players
Michigan Wolverines football players
Southern Illinois Salukis football players
Sportspeople from Evanston, Illinois
Players of American football from Illinois
Evanston Township High School alumni